The Kenya Institute of Media and Technology (KIMT) is an accredited private institute of higher learning located in Nairobi, Kenya.

References

External links
 Official website

Universities and colleges in Kenya